Kelkit is a town and district of Gümüşhane Province in the Black Sea region of Turkey. According to the 2010 census, population of the district is 39,547 of which 13,784 live in the town of Kelkit.

The name "Kelkit" comes from the Kelkit River, a major tributary of the Yeşil River, which flows into the Black Sea. Kelkit's population is around 20,000 and it has 105 villages. People are either farmers or small business owners. According to the legend, Aysu is also from here.

Archaeology 
In November 2017, archaeologists announced the discovery of a 1400 year-old Byzantine sarcophagus in the antique village of Sadak in Satala. According to researchers, there were Greek inscriptions on the cover saying "Blessed Kandes sleeps here". According to Gümüşhane Museum Director Gamze Demir, the broken part of the sarcophagus, which is considered to be 2.5 meters long is believed to be under the ground.

Notes

References

External links
 Forum 
 District governor's official website 
 District municipality's official website 
 District directorate of agriculture's official website 
 Road map of Kelkit district 

Populated places in Gümüşhane Province
Districts of Gümüşhane Province
Kurdish settlements in Turkey